Where Are You Going is a 1973 album by Shirley Horn.

The album was reissued with Dizzy Gillespie's 1969 album The Real Thing on CD in 1996. Billboard magazine featured the album as a "Radio Action and Pick LP" in their February 17, 1973 issue.

Track listing 
 "Where Are You Going" – 4:19
 "Something Happens to Me" (Marvin Fisher, Jack Segal) – 2:11
 "Come on Home" – 2:23
 "Do It Again" (Buddy DeSylva, George Gershwin) – 7:02
 "The Eagle and Me" (Harold Arlen, E.Y. "Yip" Harburg) – 2:50
 "Taste of Honey" (Bobby Scott, Ric Marlow) – 5:39
 "L.A. Breakdown" (Larry Marks) – 4:48
 "Consequences of a Drug Addict Role" (Shirley Horn) – 6:00

Personnel 
 Shirley Horn – vocals
 Al Gafa – guitar
 Marshall T. Harris – double bass
 Bernard Sweetney – drums
 Boo Frazier – producer

References 

1973 albums
Perception Records albums
Shirley Horn albums